Justin Peter Papadimitriou (born October 13, 1977), family name changed to Peroff, is best known as the drummer for the Toronto-based indie rock collective Broken Social Scene. He is a credited actor, appearing in the major motion picture How to Lose a Guy in 10 Days and the Canadian television shows Straight Up and Our Hero. Peroff is a known DJ, spinning Broken Social Scene after parties worldwide and when stationed in his home town of Toronto. He also fulfills bi-weekly and monthly DJ gigs at clubs and bars citywide. Peroff is also an event promoter and artist manager, managing Toronto based producer / musician and Last Gang artist Harrison and Toronto based neo-soul singer / artist and film maker M.I. Blue.

External links
 Broken Social Scene Official Website
 

1977 births
Living people
Canadian indie rock musicians
Canadian rock drummers
Canadian male drummers
Canadian male television actors
People from Markham, Ontario
Musicians from Ontario
Broken Social Scene members
Male actors from Ontario
20th-century Canadian drummers
21st-century Canadian drummers
Juno Award for Recording Package of the Year winners
20th-century Canadian male musicians
21st-century Canadian male musicians